HMS Ardent was a Royal Navy 64-gun third rate. This ship of the line was launched on 21 December 1782 at Bursledon, Hampshire. She disappeared in 1794, believed lost to a fire and explosion.

Career

In 1784 she was under the command of Captain Harry Harmood, serving as a guard ship at Portsmouth.

In 1793 she was under the command of Captain Robert Manners Sutton, sailing with Vice-Admiral Lord Hood at Toulon in August. She was part of a force detached under Robert Linzee to take part in the attack on Corsica in September.

Fate
In April 1794 Ardent was stationed off the harbour of Villa Franca, to watch two French frigates. It is presumed that she caught fire and blew up.  encountered some wreckage while cruising in the Gulf of Genoa in the summer that suggested fire and an explosion. A part of Ardent's quarter deck with some gunlocks deeply embedded in it was found floating in the area, as was splinter netting driven into planking.  No trace was ever found of her crew of 500.

See also
List of people who disappeared mysteriously at sea

Citations

References

Lavery, Brian (2003) The Ship of the Line - Volume 1: The development of the battlefleet 1650-1850. Conway Maritime Press. .

External links
 

1782 ships
1790s missing person cases
Crown-class ships of the line
Maritime incidents in 1794
Missing ships
Non-combat naval accidents
People lost at sea
Ships built on the River Hamble
Ships of the line of the Royal Navy
Ships sunk by non-combat internal explosions
Shipwrecks in the Mediterranean Sea
Warships lost with all hands